Enteng Kabisote 4: Okay Ka Fairy Ko... The Beginning of the Legend is a 2007 comedy fantasy film, the fourth and last installment of the original Enteng Kabisote films, and the sixth installment based on the Philippine television sitcom Okay Ka, Fairy Ko!. The film is an official entry for the 2007 Metro Manila Film Festival.

Plot
Mortal Enteng Kabisote (Vic Sotto) and his magical fairy wife Faye (Kristine Hermosa) continue to face danger and adventure in this fourth film based on the popular Filipino television series "Okay Ka, Fairy Ko." The hazards this time include a time-traveling mirror (to cure Enteng of his amnesia, which plays Okay Ka, Fairy Ko! episodes), an evil dragon lady, a vampirish villain Dark Angel, a gun-armed bad guy, a mysterious man (later to be one of Faye's rejected suitors) and the ever-present aswangs. As always, Enteng must rise to the challenges to protect his beloved family from all the potential mayhem.

Cast

Main Cast
Vic Sotto as Vicente "Enteng" Kabisote
Kristine Hermosa as Chlorateam "Faye" Kabisote

Supporting Cast
Giselle Toengi as Ina Magenta
Aiza Seguerra as Aiza Kabisote
Oyo Boy Sotto as Benok Kabisote
Mikylla Ramirez as Ada Kabisote
Ian Veneracion as Dark Angel
Carlos Agassi as Nardong Yakitiyak
Michael de Mesa as Prinsipe Inok
Caridad Sanchez as Nanay Choleng
Francine Prieto as Dragon Lady/Beng
Peque Gallaga as Timelord
Candy Pangilinan as Elsa
Ruby Rodriguez as Amy
Jose Manalo as Jose
Arthur Solinap as Blasting Man/Dino 
Eunice Lagusad as Dingdong
Eliza Pineda as Flora
Robert Villar as Ading
Ian de Leon as Leo

Special Participation
Jomari Yllana as José Rizal
Joey de Leon as Karimarimar
Wally Bayola as Arianey No Money

Cameo appearances
Cristine Reyes as Sarah Medical
Ric Pacheco as Faith Healer
Jed Del Mundo as Jed the Giant
Nonong de Andres as Aswang
Clayton Olalia as Police Chief

See also
 Okay Ka, Fairy Ko! (film series)

References

External links
 

Enteng Kabisote
2007 films
Cultural depictions of José Rizal
2000s fantasy comedy films
OctoArts Films films
M-Zet Productions films
Philippine fantasy comedy films
Films directed by Tony Y. Reyes